Trina Pratt (born August 30, 1986) is an American former competitive ice dancer. With Todd Gilles, she won four ISU Junior Grand Prix medals and the 2005 U.S. national junior title, and placed sixth at the 2006 World Junior Championships.

Pratt initially competed with her brother, Robert. She teamed up with Todd Gilles at the 2002 Lake Placid, New York dance competition. They announced the ending of their partnership on December 13, 2006. She teamed up with Chris Obzansky in 2008.

Programs 
(with Gilles)

Competitive highlights

With Chris Obzansky

With Todd Gilles

With Robert Pratt

References

External links

 

American female ice dancers
Living people
1986 births
Sportspeople from Iowa City, Iowa
21st-century American women